Cuboid may refer to:

 Cuboid, in geometry a convex polyhedron bounded by six quadrilateral faces, whose polyhedral graph is the same as that of a cube 
 Cuboid (computer vision), a feature used for behavior recognition in video
 Cuboid (video game), a puzzle game for the PlayStation Network
 Cuboid bone, one of seven tarsal bones in the human foot
 Cuboid syndrome, a medical condition of the human foot